The National Endowment for Democracy (NED) is an organization in the United States that was founded in 1983 for promoting democracy in other countries by promoting political and economic institutions such as political groups, trade unions, free markets and business groups. NED is funded primarily by an annual allocation from the U.S. Congress. The NED was created by The Democracy Program as a bipartisan, private, non-profit corporation, and in turn acts as a grant-making foundation. In addition to its grants program, the NED also supports and houses the Journal of Democracy, the World Movement for Democracy, the International Forum for Democratic Studies, the Reagan–Fascell Fellowship Program, the Network of Democracy Research Institutes, and the Center for International Media Assistance.

History

Founding
The National Security Decision Directive 77 was instrumental for the creation of Project Democracy and its offspring NED.

In a 1982 speech at the Palace of Westminster, President Ronald Reagan proposed an initiative, before the British Parliament, "to foster the infrastructure of democracy – the system of a free press, unions, political parties, universities." This intersected with previously-formulated plans by the American Political Foundation, an NGO supported by some members of the Republican and Democratic parties, together with scholars based at CSIS, to create a government-funded but privately-run democracy promotion foundation to support democratic civil society groups and parties. The idea was strongly championed by the State Department, which argued that a non-governmental foundation would be able to support dissident groups and organizations in the Soviet Bloc, and also foster the emergence of democratic movements in US-allied dictatorships that were becoming unstable and in danger of experiencing leftist or radical revolutions, without provoking a diplomatic backlash against the US government. After some initial uncertainty over the idea from Reagan Administration hard-liners, the U.S. government, through USAID (United States Agency for International Development), contracted The American Political Foundation to study democracy promotion, which became known as "The Democracy Program". The Program recommended the creation of a bipartisan, private, non-profit corporation to be known as the National Endowment for Democracy (NED). NED, though non-governmental, would be funded primarily through annual appropriations from the U.S. government and subject to congressional oversight. The functions of the Endowment given in the Democracy Program's Interim Report to Congress were to encourage and facilitate exchanges between democratic institutions through private sectors; promote nongovernmental participation in democratic training programs; strengthening democratic electoral processes abroad in cooperation with indigenous democratic forces; fostering cooperation between American private sector groups and those abroad "dedicated to the cultural values, institutions, and organizations of democratic pluralism", and encouraging democratic development consistent with the interests of both the U.S and the other groups receiving assistance.

In 1983, the House Foreign Affairs Committee proposed legislation to provide initial funding of $31.3 million for NED as part of the State Department Authorization Act (H.R. 2915), because NED was in its beginning stages of development the appropriation was set at $18 million. Included in the legislation was $13.8 million for the Free Trade Union Institute, an affiliate of the AFL–CIO, $2.5 million for an affiliate of the National Chamber Foundation, and $5 million each for two party institutes, which was later eliminated by a vote of 267–136. The conference report on H.R. 2915 was adopted by the House on November 17, 1983, and the Senate the following day. On November 18, 1983, articles of incorporation were filed in the District of Columbia to establish the National Endowment for Democracy as a nonprofit organization.

1980s to present
An analysis by political scientist Sarah Bush found that while NED activity in the 1980s focused on direct challenges to autocrats by funding dissidents, opposition parties, and unions, the majority of 21st-century NED funding goes to technical programs that are less likely to challenge the status quo, with the proportion of NED funding for "relatively tame programs" increasing from roughly 20% of NED grants in 1986 to roughly 60% in 2009. Political scientist Lindsey A. O'Rourke writes that, "Today, NED programs run in more than ninety countries. Although the number of US-backed democracy promotion programs have grown, most of today's programs pursue less aggressive objectives than their Cold War counterparts."

The NED played a role in supporting the Arab Spring of 2011. For example, the April 6 Youth Movement in Egypt, the Bahrain Center for Human Rights and individual Yemeni activist Entsar Qadhi received training and finances from the NED. In Egypt, between 2008 and 2012, it also supported Colonel Omar Afifi Soliman, an exiled police officer who opposed both Hosni Mubarak's and Mohamed Morsi's presidencies, as well as secularist activist Esraa Abdel-Fatah's Egyptian Democratic Academy in 2011.

Since 2004 it has granted US$8,758,300 to Uyghur groups including the World Uyghur Congress, the Uyghur Human Rights Project, the Campaign for Uyghurs and The Uyghur Transitional Justice Database Project. It has also supported Chinese dissidents. For example, between 2005 and 2012 it gave small grants to the China Free Press NGO and in 2019 it gave about $643,000 to civil society programmes in Hong Kong. In response, in 2020 China imposed sanctions on NED president Carl Gershman and Michael Abramowitz, the president of Freedom House.

Funding and structure
NED is a grant-making foundation, distributing funds to private non-governmental organizations for promoting democracy abroad in around 90 countries. Half of NED's funding is allocated annually to four main U.S. organizations: the American Center for International Labor Solidarity (associated with the AFL–CIO), the Center for International Private Enterprise (affiliated with the USCC), the National Democratic Institute for International Affairs (associated with the Democratic Party), and the International Republican Institute (formerly known as the National Republican Institute for International Affairs and affiliated with the Republican Party). The other half of NED's funding is awarded annually to hundreds of non-governmental organizations based abroad which apply for support. In 2011, the Democratic and Republican Institutes channeled around $100 million a year through the NED.

Source of funding
The NED receives an annual appropriation from the U.S. budget (it is included in the chapter of the Department of State budget destined for the U.S. Agency for International Development-USAID) and is subject to congressional oversight even as a non-governmental organization.

From 1984 to 1990 the NED received $15–18 million of congressional funding annually, and $25–30 million from 1991 to 1993. At the time the funding came via the United States Information Agency. In 1993 the NED nearly lost its congressional funding, after the House of Representatives initially voted to abolish its funding. The funding (of $35 million, a rise from $30 million the year before) was only retained after a vigorous campaign by NED supporters.

In the financial year to the end of September 2009 NED had an income of $135.5 million, nearly all of which came from U.S Government agencies. In addition to government funding, the NED has received funding from foundations, such as the Smith Richardson Foundation, the John M. Olin Foundation, and others. The Bradley Foundation supported the Journal of Democracy with $1.5 million during 1990–2008.

In 2018, President Donald Trump proposed to slash the NED's funding and cut its links to the Democratic and Republican Institutes.

Board

NED's current president is Damon Wilson. His predecessor was Carl Gershman, serving between April 30, 1984 and July 2021. Carl Gershman was a former Senior Counselor to the United States Representative to the United Nations and former executive director of Social Democrats, USA.

Democracy Award
NED's Board of Directors annually gives a Democracy Award to recognize "the courageous and creative work of individuals and organizations that have advanced the cause of human rights and democracy around the world." The trophy is a small-scale replica of the Goddess of Democracy that was constructed during the 1989 Tiananmen Square protests.

Notable recipients include: Nobel Peace Prize laureate Liu Xiaobo, former President of Mexico Vicente Fox, and journalist Veton Surroi. Past speakers at the award's ceremony have included U.S. Senator John McCain, Former Speaker of the House Paul Ryan and Speaker of the House Nancy Pelosi.

Recipients

Center for International Media Assistance (CIMA)
In 2006, CIMA was founded as an initiative of the National Endowment for Democracy with encouragement from Congress and a grant from the State Department's Bureau of Democracy, Human Rights and Labor. CIMA promotes the work of independent media and journalists abroad, with a focus on the developing world, social media, digital media, and citizen journalism. It issued its first report, Empowering Independent Media: U.S. Efforts to Foster Free and Independent Media Around the World, in 2008, and subsequently issued other reports, including a report on digital media in conflict-prone societies and a report on mobile phone use in Africa.

Reaction

Praise and criticism
Writing in Slate in 2004, Brendan I. Koerner wrote that, "Depending on whom you ask, the NED is either a nonprofit champion of liberty or an ideologically driven meddler in world affairs."

NED has been criticized by both the right and the left. Some on the right accuse the NED of having a pro-social democracy agenda, promoted through its labor affiliate; conversely, some on the left accuse the NED of being "a rightwing initiative" oriented toward Reagan's Cold War politics. Within Latin America, critics accuse the NED of manifesting U.S. paternalism or imperialism, conversely, "supporters say that it helps many groups with a social-democratic and liberal orientation across the world," providing training and support for pro-democracy groups that criticize the U.S. In a 2004 article for the Washington Post, Michael McFaul argues that the NED is not an instrument of U.S. foreign policy. He said he experienced the difference between the actions of US policymakers and the actions of the National Democratic Institute (NDI) while representing the NDI in Moscow during the last days of the Soviet Union: U.S. policymakers supported Mikhail Gorbachev while the NDI worked with Democratic Russia, Gorbachev's opponents. NED has said in public statements that democracy evolves "according to the needs and traditions of diverse political cultures" and does not necessitate an American-style model.

In 1986, NED's President Carl Gershman said that the NED was created because "It would be terrible for democratic groups around the world to be seen as subsidized by the CIA. We saw that in the 1960s and that's why it has been discontinued". Throughout the course of a 2010 investigation by ProPublica, Paul Steiger, the then editor in chief of the publication said that "those who spearheaded creation of NED have long acknowledged it was part of an effort to move from covert to overt efforts to foster democracy" and cited as evidence a 1991 interview in which then-NED president Allen Weinstein said, "A lot of what we do today was done covertly 25 years ago by the CIA."  Critics have compared the NED's funding of Nicaraguan groups (pro-U.S. and conservative unions, political parties, student groups, business groups, and women's associations) in the 1980s and 1990s in Nicaragua to the previous CIA effort "to challenge and undermine" a left-wing government in Chile. (Latin Americanist scholar William M. LeoGrande writes that the NED's roughly $2 million funding into Nicaragua between 1984 and 1988 was the "main source of overt assistance to the civic opposition," of which about half went to the anti-Sandinista newspaper La Prensa.) According to sociologist William Robinson, NED funds during the Reagan years were "ultimately used for five overlapping pseudo-covert activities: leadership training for pro-American elites, promotion of pro-American educational systems and mass media, strengthening the 'institutions of democracy' by funding pro-American organizations in the target state, propaganda, and the development of transnational elite networks." Critiquing these activities, Robinson wrote that "U.S. policymakers claim that they are interested in process (free and fair elections) and not outcome (the results of these elections); in reality, the principal concern is outcome." Political scientist Lindsey A. O'Rourke writes that the Reagan-era NED played a key role in U.S. efforts "to promote democratic transitions in Chile, Haiti, Liberia, Nicaragua, Panama, the Philippines, Poland, and Suriname," but did so to promote the success of pro-U.S. parties, not just to promote democracy, and did not support communist or socialist opposition parties.

In the 2020 Thai protests, pro-government groups cited NED support for protester-sympathizing groups to assert that the US government was masterminding the protests. The United States Embassy in Bangkok formally denied allegations of funding or supporting protesters.

In August 2021, Malaysian human rights activist and Suaram adviser Kua Kia Soong criticized the opposition coalition Pakatan Harapan for accepting funding from the National Endowment of Democracy, which he described as a "CIA soft power front". Citing the US track record of supporting regime change abroad and racial discrimination against Black and Asian Americans, Kua urged Malaysian civil society organizations to stop accepting funding from the NED since it undermined their legitimacy, independence, and effectiveness. Kua's statement came after Daniel Twining, the president of the NED affiliate International Republican Institute, had made remarks in 2018 acknowledging that the NED had financially supported Malaysian opposition parties since 2002. Following the 2018  Malaysian general election Twining had also praised the newly-elected Pakatan Harapan government for freezing Chinese infrastructural investments.

Reaction from foreign governments

Russia
Russian government officials and state media have frequently regarded the NED as hostile to their country. In 2015, the Russian state news agency RIA Novosti blamed NED grants for the Euromaidan mass protests that forced Ukrainian President Viktor Yanukovych from power. In July 2015, the Russian government declared NED to be an "undesirable" NGO, making the endowment the first organization banned under the Russian undesirable organizations law signed two months earlier by Russian President Vladimir Putin.

China
During the 2014 Hong Kong protests, a Chinese newspaper accused the US of using the NED to fund pro-democracy protesters. Michael Pillsbury, a Hudson Institute foreign policy analyst and former Reagan administration official, stated that the accusation was "not totally false". In 2019, the government of the People's Republic of China sanctioned the NED in response to the passage by the U.S. Congress of the Hong Kong Human Rights and Democracy Act. The Chinese government stated that the NED and CIA worked in tandem to covertly foment the 2019–20 Hong Kong protests, and that NED acted as a U.S. intelligence front. NED was one of several U.S.-based NGOs sanctioned by the Chinese government; others included the Human Rights Watch, Freedom House, the National Democratic Institute, and the International Republican Institute. China also already tightly restricted the activities of foreign NGOs in China, particularly since 2016, and the NGOs sanctioned by China typically do not have offices on the mainland; as a result, the sanctions were regarded as mostly symbolic. NED grant recipients in Hong Kong included labor advocacy and human rights groups such as the Solidarity Center and Justice Centre Hong Kong. The Chinese government said that the sanctioned organizations were "anti-China" forces that "incite separatist activities for Hong Kong independence"; a U.S. State Department official said that "false accusations of foreign interference" against U.S.-based NGOs were "intended to distract from the legitimate concerns of Hongkongers." NED has denied it provided aid to protestors in 2019.

In August 2020, the Chinese government sanctioned NED chairman Carl Gershman, together with the heads of four other U.S.-based democracy and human rights organizations and six U.S. Republican lawmakers for supporting the Hong Kong pro-democracy movement in the 2019–20 Hong Kong protests. The unspecified sanctions were a tit-for-tat measure responding to the earlier sanctioning by the U.S. of 11 Hong Kong officials in response to the enactment of the Hong Kong National Security Law in June 2020.

In December 2020 China sanctioned the senior director of the NED, John Knaus, saying he "blatantly interferes in Hong Kong affairs and grossly interferes in China's domestic affairs".

In May 2022, the Chinese Ministry of Foreign Affairs accused NED of funding separatists to undermine the stability of target countries, instigating color revolutions to subvert state power, and meddling in other countries' politics.

Elsewhere
Other governments that have objected to NED activity include Iran, Egypt under Hosni Mubarak, India under Narendra Modi, and Venezuela.

See also
List of recipients of the Democracy Service Medal
National Democratic Institute for International Affairs
United Nations Democracy Fund
Westminster Foundation for Democracy

References

Further reading

 
 
 
Kate Geoghegan, "A Policy in Tension: The National Endowment for Democracy and the U.S. Response to the Collapse of the Soviet Union," Diplomatic History, Volume 42, Issue 5, November 2018, Pages 772–801,
Søndergaard, R.S. 2020. "The contested origins of US democracy promotion: the national endowment for democracy and its congressional critics." International Politics.

External links

Official site

 
Organizations established in 1983
1983 establishments in Washington, D.C.
Foreign policy and strategy think tanks in the United States
Political and economic think tanks in the United States
Undesirable organizations in Russia